Schoenoplectiella mucronata  is a species of flowering plant in the sedge family known by the common names bog bulrush, rough-seed bulrush, and ricefield bulrush. It is native to Eurasia, Africa and Australia.  It grows in moist and wet terrestrial habitat, and in shallow water. It is a perennial herb growing from a short, hard rhizome. The erect, three-angled stems grow in dense clumps and can reach a metre tall. The leaves take the form of sheaths wrapped around the base of stem, but they generally do not have blades. The inflorescence is a headlike cluster of cone-shaped spikelets accompanied by an angled, stiff bract which may look like a continuation of the stem.

It is a weed of rice fields in California.

Taxonomy

The accepted name for this species is Schoenoplectiella mucronata according to the Council of Heads of Australasian Herbaria, and the Plants of the World Online database.

This plant has some 35 synonyms according to Plants of the world online, but the Council of Heads of Australasian Herbaria lists two. It was first described as Scirpus mucronatus in 1753 by Carl Linnaeus. In 1889 Eduard Palla transferred it to the genus, Schoenoplectus, and Schoenoplectus mucronatus was the accepted name until 2010 when it was transferred to the genus, Schoenoplectiella  by Jongduk Jung and Hong-Kuen Choi.

References

External links
Photos and distribution from GBIF

mucronata
Plants described in 1753
Taxa named by Carl Linnaeus